Issam Fares (born 1937) is a Lebanese businessman, a former member of the Lebanese Parliament and deputy prime minister of Lebanon.

In 1954, at the age of seventeen, Fares left his homeland and found a job as a clerk at a catering and food services firm in Qatar. Two years later, he was heading Abela Group’s finances and subsequently managing its operations in Pakistan, Kuwait, Iran and Saudi Arabia.

At age 38, Fares went into business for himself and established a civil engineering and construction firm, which completed many notable projects including the world's longest international bridge, which connects Bahrain to Saudi Arabia.

He then sold the company to British Aerospace, and used the proceeds to buy up Houston-based investment firm, Wedge Group, a company that he heads today.

Early life
Issam Michael Fares was born in Tripoli, Lebanon, in 1937. He was educated at Tripoli College, and graduated in 1954.

Career
In the general elections of 2000, Fares won the seat of Akkar, the first district of the North Lebanon. He served as deputy prime minister of Lebanon from 2000 to 2005. Prior to that his career spans four decades in the Persian Gulf, specifically Saudi Arabia, where he began with Abela Catering and then Ballast Needam.  By the early 1970s Fares was playing a key role in the infrastructure buildout of Saudi Arabia, including roads and housing.

The Fares Center for Eastern Mediterranean Studies at Tufts University, and the Issam Fares Institute for Public Policy and International Affairs at the American University of Beirut (AUB) are named after him. He operates the Houston, Texas based WEDGE Group.

Personal life
Issam Fares owns one of the 200 largest superyachts in the world, the Wedge Too. It has a length of 65m (213’25") and was designed by Philippe Starck. It was built in 2002 in the Netherlands. Fares has donated over a billion dollars to various political, educational and philanthropic institutions.

Fares is married to Hala Fares.

Their daughter Noor Fares is a jewelry designer, married the artist Alexandre Al Khawam in 2015, and lives in Belgravia, London.

Their son Nijad Fares is married to Zeina, and they live in Houston, Texas, US.

References

External links
 Issam Fares home page

20th-century Lebanese businesspeople
21st-century Lebanese businesspeople
1937 births
Living people
Members of the Parliament of Lebanon
Deputy prime ministers of Lebanon
Eastern Orthodox Christians from Lebanon
Commandeurs of the Légion d'honneur
Knights of St. Gregory the Great
Recipients of the Order of the Phoenix (Greece)
Recipients of the Order of Prince Yaroslav the Wise
Grand Officers of the National Order of the Cedar
Recipients of the Order of Saint Ignatius of Antioch
People from Tripoli, Lebanon